Innes "Bunny" Finlayson (4 July 1899 – 29 January 1980) was a New Zealand rugby union player who represented the national team, the All Blacks, between 1925 and 1930. His position of choice was flanker.

Born in Maungaturoto in 1899, Finlayson was educated at Maungaturoto School. He died in Whangarei in 1980, and was buried at Maunu Cemetery.

Career 
He made his first-class debut in North Auckland's first ever match, against South Island Country in 1920 at Kensington Park, Whangarei. He scored the first try in the union's history playing as a wing three-quarter.

Considered an in-form player Finlayson played in all six tour matches. He was later selected for the 1928 tour of South Africa where he played in all four test matches. In total he played 36 matches for the All Blacks with six of them being test matches. Although he scored no points in test matches, he totalled 35 points (11 tries, 1 conversion) in games for the All Blacks.

Finlayson served as a North Auckland selector from 1933 to 1935 and 1939 to 1940.

Family 
Other members of Finlayson's family were also prominent in rugby union. Three of his brothers, "Bain", "Tote" and Angus represented North Auckland in the 1920s. Another brother, Jack, was the North Auckland RFU president for the 1950 season, while another, Callum, played for Otago between 1927 and 1930. Angus also represented Auckland for a decade between 1924 and 1934.

References 

1899 births
1980 deaths
Rugby union players from Whangārei
New Zealand rugby union players
New Zealand international rugby union players
Northland rugby union players
Rugby union wings
Rugby union flankers
Burials at Maunu Cemetery